Bobby Ray Shanklin (June 4, 1947 - March 6, 2015) was a composer. Along with Ed Bogas, he co-composed the scores for Ralph Bakshi's films Fritz the Cat and Heavy Traffic.

References

1947 births
2015 deaths
American film score composers
American male film score composers
Place of birth missing